Tarsolepis malayana is a moth in the family Notodontidae. Previously the species was treated as a subspecies of Tarsolepis rufobrunnea.

Characteristics
The submarginal area, which touches the upper silver spot, is pale orange-brown filled and curved. The ground colour of the wings is fuscous violet-brown. The underside of the thorax displays a prominent red brush.

Distribution and habitat
The species is found in India, Burma and widely distributed in Sundaland. It prefers lowland rain forests.

References

External links
The moths of Borneo

Notodontidae
Moths of Borneo
Moths of Malaysia
Moths described in 1976